This is a list of notable Jews in religion.

Biblical figures

See: List of Jewish Biblical figures.

High Priests

See: List of High Priests of Israel.

Rabbis

See: List of rabbis.

Rosh yeshivas

See: List of rosh yeshivas.

Karaite Jewish Hakhamim

See: List of Karaite Jews.

Religious figures by country

Germany

Scholars
 Felix Adler
 Hugo Bergmann (born in Prague)
 Max Bodenheimer
 David Cassel
 Ismar Elbogen
 Emil Ludwig Fackenheim
 Jonas Fränkel
 Heinrich Graetz, Jewish historian (born in Posen)
 Manuel Joël, Jewish philosopher 
 Isaak Markus Jost, Jewish historian
 Marcus Kalisch, Biblical scholar
 Jakob Klatzkin
 Israel Lewy
 Moses Mendelssohn, Jewish Enlightenment philosopher
 David Rosin
 Gershom Scholem, Jewish scholar and historian
 Ernst Simon
 Friedrich Weinreb (born in Lemberg)
 Benedict Zuckermann
 Leopold Zunz, Jewish scholar

Other
 Ayya Khema, Buddhist teacher (born Jewish)
 Adolf Lasson
 Georg Lasson
 Johannes Pfefferkorn, antisemitic controversialist (born Jewish) 
 Friedrich Adolf Philippi
 Johann Peter Spaeth (Moses Germanus Ashkenazi), a Christian German Proselyte
 Edith Stein, canonized nun, Holocaust victim (born Jewish)

Hungary
 Joseph Breuer
 Henrik Bródy 
 J. H. Hertz, Chief Rabbi of Great Britain
 Abraham Hochmuth
 Sanz-Klausenberger rebbe from Kolozsvár (now Cluj-Napoca, Romania)
 Ludwig Lichtenstein
 Yosef Greenwald, Puppa rebbe
 Sándor Scheiber, rabbi and director of the Budapest Rabbinical Seminary
 Solomon Marcus Schiller-Szinessy, rabbi and first Jewish professor in Cambridge
 Isaac Tyrnau
 Joachim Jacob Unger
 Wahrmann family
 Michoel Ber Weissmandl
 Béla Wenckheim

United Kingdom

Other religious leaders
 Selig Brodetsky, President of the British Board of Deputies
 Barnett Janner, President of the British Board of Deputies
 Greville Janner, President of the British Board of Deputies
 Ewen Montagu, President of the United Synagogue
 Claude Montefiore, co-founder of British Liberal Judaism
 Anthony Rothschild, first president of the United Synagogue

United States

Rebbetzins
Rebbetzin Esther Jungreis, Hungarian born founder of Hineni
Chaya Mushka Schneerson, rebbetzin of Chabad

Other religious leaders (including Jews associated with religions outside of Judaism)
 Apostles, the "Twelve Apostles", first followers of Jesus 
 Ram Dass, modern American Hindu author
 Jacob Frank, self-proclaimed messiah in Poland, founder of Frankists
 Maurice Frydman Polish Jew who lived in India and was involved in translating Nisargadatta's "I am That." Was close to Gandhi and Nehru
 Jesus, inspired the creation of Christianity
 John the Baptist, revered by Christians
 Jean-Marie Lustiger, French Cardinal (raised Catholic)
 John Joseph O'Connor
 Saint Peter, considered the first Pope
 Saul of Tarsus, early Christian leader
 Edith Stein, Catholic nun, Holocaust victim
 St. Teresa of Avila, Catholic saint (parents were Conversos)

References 

Religion